The Kachina Doll Mystery is the sixty-second volume in the Nancy Drew Mystery Stories series. It was first published in 1981 under the pseudonym Carolyn Keene.

Plot
When Nancy, Bess, and George arrive at the McGuire's Fitness ranch in Arizona, they discover that the future of the ranch is being threatened by unexplained accidents. Teaming up with a ghost, Nancy begins her search for a precious collection of ancient kachina dolls and hunts for her elusive adversary who is determined to prevent the ranch from operating.

References

Nancy Drew books
1982 American novels
1982 children's books
Novels set in Arizona
Simon & Schuster books
Children's mystery novels